Vinicius Elías Teixeira (born 31 December 1977), commonly known as Vinicius, is a Brazilian futsal player who plays for Intelli as a Universal. Brother of Lenísio.

Honours
2 World Cup (2008, 2012)
4 División de Honor (05/06, 06/07, 08/09)
2 Copa de España (2008, 2010)
5 Liga Futsal (1997, 2001, 2002, 2012, 2013)
1 Copa Brasil (2001)
1 Superliga (2013)
1 Taça Libertadores (2013)
2 Supercopas de España (2006, 2010)
2 Grand Prix (2005, 2009,2011)
2 Best player LNFS (08/09)(09/10)
2 Best Ala-pívot LNFS (08/09)(09/10)

References

External links
lnfs.es

1977 births
Living people
People from Cuiabá
Brazilian men's futsal players
Azkar Lugo FS players
ElPozo Murcia FS players
Inter FS players
MFK Dinamo Moskva players
ADC Intelli players
Sportspeople from Mato Grosso